American rock band Car Seat Headrest has released 12 studio albums, 5 extended plays, 3 live albums, and 2 compilation albums. Starting in 2010, band self-released its first eight albums on the platform Bandcamp. In 2015, the band signed to Matador Records, and has since released four albums through the label.

Studio albums

Live albums

Compilation albums

Extended plays

Singles

Music videos

Notes

References

Discographies of American artists
Rock music group discographies